Andrew Lord (born February 22, 1985) is a Canadian former professional ice hockey player who is the head coach for the Greenville Swamp Rabbits in the ECHL.

Early life and education 
Lord was born in West Vancouver. He attended the Rensselaer Polytechnic Institute in Troy, New York, from 2004 to 2008, where he played ice hockey and earned a bachelor's degree in business management.

Career 
Lord launched his professional career in the ECHL, where he spent two and a half years with the Wheeling Nailers, before moving to the American Hockey League (AHL), signing with the Oklahoma City Barons in late December 2010. He had to sit out the 2011-12 season with an injury.

In 2012, Lord took up on offer from Germany and inked a deal with second-division side SC Riessersee. After spending one year in Germany, he signed with the Cardiff Devils of the Elite Ice Hockey League (EIHL) for the 2013-14 season. Showing his scoring ability, he tallied 23 goals and 36 assists in 60 games during his first year there.

Prior to his second year with the Devils (2014–15), he accepted the position as player/coach and kept his scoring hot, chipping in with 23 goals and 38 assists in 62 contests, guiding his team to the EIHL Challenge Cup title and a third-place finish in the EIHL, while receiving All-EIHL Coach of the Year honors.

Lord retired from playing in 2018, reverting to the sole title of head coach.

On 19 June 2020, the Cardiff Devils announced that Lord would be leaving the club after seven years, six as coach, pursuing another coaching opportunity in North America. Later that same day, Lord was announced as the new head coach of the Greenville Swamp Rabbits. In 2021, he was given the title of general manager with the Swamp Rabbits.

References

External links

1985 births
Living people
Canadian ice hockey centres
Canadian ice hockey coaches
Ice hockey people from British Columbia
Milwaukee Admirals players
Oklahoma City Barons players
People from West Vancouver
Rochester Americans players
RPI Engineers men's ice hockey players
Wheeling Nailers players
Cardiff Devils players
Canadian expatriate ice hockey players in Germany
Canadian expatriate ice hockey players in Wales
Canadian expatriate ice hockey players in the United States